Telecom Namibia Limited, commonly known as Telecom Namibia, is a telecommunications service provider operating in Namibia. It is the national telecommunications operator, established in August 1992 and wholly owned by the Government of Namibia. Telecom Namibia is a commercialised company and a subsidiary of Namibia Post and Telecom Holdings Limited. Telecom Namibia is serving more than 396,000 (fixed and mobile) customers, with 986 employees and annual revenue of more than N$1,5 Billion. It runs the largest digital telecommunication network in Namibia.

Telecom Namibia acquired tn mobile in 2013 and it was incorporated as its mobile telecommunication division. Tn mobile's biggest competitors are MTC Namibia, Paratus Telecom and MTN Namibia.

Services

Landline
Telecom Namibia holds the monopoly for landline access in Namibia.
In June 2022, there had been 88,000 accesses. This is a decrease of about 40 percent compared to 2021. Customers in some cities are connected via fibre, and technologies like DSL and ISDN are also used.

Cellular 
Using CDMA, Telecom Namibia offered cellular communication.
With the brand SWITCH, it was officially established as third cellular provider of the country at the end of 2009.
There had been 54.000 SWITCH customers (mid of 2010).
In August 2011, Telecom Namibia announced the transformation of the CDMA network into a GSM network.

In November 2012, Telecom Namibia took over the second largest cellular provider. After that, this division is now called TN Mobile.

Web Hosting 
Using the brand iWay, Telecom Namibia offers web hosting, domain and email services.

Other Services 
At their sites, Telecom Namibia has to offer colocation to other commercial providers, like MTC Namibia.

At the site in Walvis Bay, Telecom Namibia provides maritime services, like radio and NAVTEX broadcasting of weather forecasts and navigation alerts, as well as telephony services via radio frequencies for vessels. They serve the entire coastal area of Namibia (from Cunene Delta to Oranjemund). The infrastructure comprises multiple broadcasting stations that are run remotely. Radio messages from 90% of the Earth's surface can be monitored (poles are accessed via satellite). While emergency operations are coordinated from the office in Walvis Bay, the rescue is done by South African forces. The control room is operating 24/7 in a redundant manner.

References

External links
Telecom Namibia - English language

Communications in Namibia
Mobile phone companies of Namibia
Companies based in Windhoek
Telecommunications companies established in 1992
Namibian brands
Namibian companies established in 1992